Jhilmil Sitaaron Ka Aangan Hoga is an Indian soap opera about a poor boy, Akash, and a rich girl, Angana, who fall in love and get married. Due to family tradition, Akash is forced to be a ghar jamai, or live-in son-in-law in Angana's parents' house, and feels humiliated by it. The title relates to a popular song of the same name sung by Lata Mangeshkar and Mohammed Rafi. The show started on 27 February 2012.

Plot
Kalyani Devi Raichand gets her three daughters married, and their husbands move in with her family instead of taking their wives away to their homes (which is customary in Indian society). When Kalyani and Raghuveer Raichand's youngest daughter, Angana, decides to marry Akash Sharma, Akash bids farewell to his family and becomes a ghar jamai at the Raichands' home. The young couple experiences much adversity, but Akash eventually wins respect from everyone in Angana's family, including the hard-to-please Kalyani.

Just as this conflict is resolved, tragedy strikes: Akash dies, leaving Angana shell-shocked. Soon after, the Raichands come into contact with the Chauhan family and their middle son Saumya. Saumya is a divorcé with two children; the children and Angana take a mutual liking to each other, which makes the Chauhans and the Raichands think that Angana and Saumya would be a perfect match. Under pressure from the two families, Angana and Saumya enter a loveless marriage, and Angana starts living at the Chauhan house. Within a few days, she discovers that she is pregnant with Akash's child. Saumya is shocked, but decides to stand by Angana, accepting the child as his own. But the Chauhan family learns of Angana's pregnancy. During Soumya's brother Tejas's wedding, the family discovers the truth, but they too accept the child as theirs. Love blossoms between Soumya and Angana; just then, Soumya's alcoholic ex-wife, also named Angana (also called Angie) reappears. After learning the truth, Angana brings Angie home. Angie overcomes her addiction, and Charu plots to bring her and Soumya together. However, when Soumya's friend Sameer returns from London, he and Angie fall in love and marry. After a few months, Angana gives birth to a son, Akash.

Cast
 Shriya Jha / Aleeza Khan as Angana Raichand / Angana Akash Sharma / Angana Saumya Chauhan - Saumya's second wife
 Aamir Ali as Saumya  Chauhan
 Sonia Singh as Angana "Angie" Sharma / Angana Saumya  Chauhan
 Sudha Chandran / Kamalika Guha Thakurta as Kalyani Raghuveer Raichand
 Sonica Handa / Namrata Thapa as Chandana Raichand / Chandana Pratap Singh
 Rakesh Paul as Pratap Singh
 Monaz Mevawala as Jharna Raichand
 Sonali Nikam as Priyanka
 Naresh Suri as Vimalchand Chauhan
 Shama Ninawe as Sarita Vimalchand Chauhan 
 Harsh Vashisht as Chirag Chauhan
 Karuna Pandey as Charu Chirag Chauhan
 Parth Mehrotra as Tejas Chauhan
 Rajlaxmi Solanki as Bandini
 Jitendra Trehan / Saurabh Dubey as Raghuveer Raichand
 Pankaj Singh Tiwari as Akash Sharma
 Praveen Hingoniya as Sunder
 Amit Kumar Sharma as Pannu
 Yukti Kapoor as Tanu Chauhan
 Rakshanda Khan as Kkusum Sharma / Damini Dhanraj
 Sujatha Vaishnav as Akash's maternal aunt
 Neena Cheema as Mrs. Sharma: Akash's grandmother

Music
In this serial, the theme song "Ek dil banaaya, phir pyar basaaya" was sung by Udit Narayan and Mahalakshmi Iyer. Other songs, "Ek dil mein mohabbat idhar bhi, chahat ki jaroorat udhar bhi" and "Ek dil toota idhar bhi, koi apna rootha udhar bhi", were sung by Udit Narayan and Sadhana Sargam. All of these songs were written by Raghvendra Singh.

Reception
Kshama Rao, of The Indian Express, said: "The show had an interesting premise of daughters staying back at their parents' home while their husbands come to them. It could have been a light-hearted, tongue-in-cheek look at the concept of ghar jamais but then we are talking Barjatyas here, for them to even endorse such a thought is sacrilege. Sigh!"

Awards and nomination
Raghvendra Singh was nominated for the Indian Television Academy Awards (ITA Awards), 2013 in the "best lyrics" category.

References

2012 Indian television series debuts
Sahara One original programming
2013 Indian television series endings
Indian drama television series